Outside Your Door is a Swedish independent film directed by Martin Söder, which tells the story of a young man living with Tourette syndrome without knowing it. It was released in 2002 by the production company Desperado, and won the 2003 CineStar-Youth Film Prize.

Cast 
Lina Englund as Sanna
Eric Donell as André
Björn Gustafson
Lennart Jähkel
Lennart Hjulström
Anna Granquist as Sara
Tomas Magnusson as Rolle
Gerthi Kulle as André's mother
Ann Petrén as Sanna's mother
Henrik Hjelt as Jeppe

References

External links
Outside Your Door at Nonstopsales.net

2002 films
Swedish romantic comedy films
2000s Swedish films